The Utah Warriors are a professional rugby union team that competes in Major League Rugby, the top-level rugby union competition in the United States and Canada that played its first season in 2018. The team is based in Salt Lake City, Utah, and was founded in 2010 as Utah Warriors (Rugby Super League) and re-refounded in 2017 by Rugby Utah Ventures.

Home field
The Utah Warriors play at Zions Bank Stadium in Herriman, Utah, which has a seating capacity of 5,000. The adjacent training facility includes two full-sized indoor turf fields. The Warriors share the venue with Real Monarchs, a USL Championship team affiliated with Real Salt Lake.

Broadcasts
2019 home games were shown on KMYU a CBS affiliate station owned by the Sinclair Broadcast Group. Jarom Jordan and Jonny Linehan were the on air talent.

Sponsorship

Players and personnel

Current squad
The Utah Warriors squad for the 2023 Major League Rugby season is:

 Senior 15s internationally capped players are listed in bold.
 MLR teams are allowed to field up to ten overseas players per match.

Head coaches
  Alf Daniels (2018–2019)
  Chris Latham (2020)
  Shawn Pittman (2021–2022)
  Greg Cooper (2022-Present)

Captains
 Paul Lasike (2018)
 Tim O'Malley (2019)
 Dwayne Polataivao (2020)
 Bailey Wilson (2021–present)

Honorary members
 Josh Pray (2019–present)

Records

Season standings

Notes

Honors
Major League Rugby
Playoff appearances: 2018, 2021

2018 season

° = Preseason game
°° = Playoff semifinal
 Matches won are colored green

2019 season

Exhibition

Regular season

2020 season

On March 12, 2020, MLR announced the season would go on hiatus immediately for 30 days due to the COVID-19 pandemic. It was cancelled the following week.

Regular season

2021 season

Regular season

Post season

2022 season

Regular season

See also
 Utah Warriors (Rugby Super League) – defunct rugby union team of the same name that played nationally in the United States in 2011.

References

External links
 

 
Major League Rugby teams
Rugby union teams in Utah
Sports in Salt Lake City
2017 establishments in Utah
Rugby clubs established in 2017